Alaminos may refer to:

 Alaminos, Cyprus, a village in Cyprus
 Alaminos, Guadalajara, a municipality in Spain
 Alaminos, Laguna, a municipality in the Philippines
 Alaminos, Pangasinan, a city in the Philippines
 Alaminos Airport, located in Alaminos